The 2005–06 Austrian Cup was the 72nd season of Austria's nationwide football cup competition. It started on July 26, 2005 with the first game of the preliminary round. The final was held at the Ernst-Happel-Stadion, Vienna on 9 May 2006.

The competition was won by Austria Vienna after beating Mattersburg 3–0. Due to Austria Vienna qualifying for European competition through winning the Bundesliga, Mattersburg qualified for the second qualifying round of the 2006–07 UEFA Cup as cup runners-up.

Preliminary round
The Preliminary Round involved 60 lower league clubs from all regional federations. Thirty games were played between July 26 and August 15, 2005, with the winners advancing to the first round.

|-
|colspan="3" style="background-color:#fcc;"|

|-
|colspan="3" style="background-color:#fcc;"|

|-
|colspan="3" style="background-color:#fcc;"|

|-
|colspan="3" style="background-color:#fcc;"|

|-
|colspan="3" style="background-color:#fcc;"|

|-
|colspan="3" style="background-color:#fcc;"|

|-
|colspan="3" style="background-color:#fcc;"|

|-
|colspan="3" style="background-color:#fcc;"|

|-
|colspan="3" style="background-color:#fcc;"|

|-
|colspan="3" style="background-color:#fcc;"|

|}

First round

|-
|colspan="3" style="background-color:#fcc;"|

|-
|colspan="3" style="background-color:#fcc;"|

|-
|colspan="3" style="background-color:#fcc;"|

|-
|colspan="3" style="background-color:#fcc;"|

|-
|colspan="3" style="background-color:#fcc;"|

|}

SAK Klagenfurt and SKN St. Pölten received byes to the second round

Second round
The Bundesliga clubs entered at the second round, except Rapid Wien, Austria Wien, Grazer AK and Pasching who were involved in European competition and given a bye to Round 3. The games were played on October 17–19, 2005.

|-
|colspan="3" style="background-color:#fcc;"|

|-
|colspan="3" style="background-color:#fcc;"|

|-
|colspan="3" style="background-color:#fcc;"|

|}

Third round
The winners of last year's competition, SV Horn, entered in this round.  The games were played between March 7 and 22, 2006.

|-
|colspan="3" style="background-color:#fcc;"|

|-
|colspan="3" style="background-color:#fcc;"|

|-
|colspan="3" style="background-color:#fcc;"|

|-
|colspan="3" style="background-color:#fcc;"|

|}

Quarter-finals

Semi-finals

Final

See also
 2005–06 Austrian Football Bundesliga
 2005–06 Austrian First League

References

External links
 Austrian Cup 2005-2006
 RSSSF Page

Austrian Cup, 2005-06
Austrian Cup seasons
2005–06 in Austrian football